Šebrov-Kateřina is a municipality in Blansko District in the South Moravian Region of the Czech Republic. It has about 800 inhabitants.

Administrative parts
The municipality is made up of villages of Šebrov and Svatá Kateřina.

References

Villages in Blansko District